Dannstadt-Schauernheim is a municipality in the Rhein-Pfalz-Kreis, in Rhineland-Palatinate, Germany.

It is situated approximately 11 km southwest of Ludwigshafen.

Dannstadt-Schauernheim is the seat of the Verbandsgemeinde ("collective municipality") Dannstadt-Schauernheim.

References 

Rhein-Pfalz-Kreis